Piter, a variant of the name Peter, may refer to:

People with the surname
Katarzyna Piter (born 1991), Polish tennis player

People with the given name
Piter Wilkens (born 1959), Frisian singer, guitarist, composer, lyricist, and producer

Fiction
Piter (novel), a 2010 novel by Shimun Vrochek set in the Universe of Metro 2033
Piter De Vries, character from the Dune universe

Other
FC Piter Saint Petersburg, Russian football team 
General nickname for Saint Petersburg
PiTER, a Counter Strike: Global Offensive team

See also
André Piters (born 1931), Belgian footballer
U-Piter (band), Russian rock band
Pieter (disambiguation)
Pyotr
Peter (disambiguation)